Heaven in a Wild Flower  is a 1985 compilation album featuring tracks by English singer/songwriter Nick Drake, taken from Five Leaves Left, Bryter Layter and Pink Moon. The title of the compilation is taken from the lines of William Blake poem Auguries of Innocence. The album does not feature any of Drake's posthumously released material and because of the availability of more comprehensive compilations, such as Way to Blue and Fruit Tree, this collection is largely out of print.

Track listing
All songs by Nick Drake.

"Fruit Tree" – 4:49
"Cello Song" – 4:48
"The Thoughts of Mary Jane" – 3:20
"Northern Sky" – 3:46
"River Man" – 4:20
"At the Chime of a City Clock" – 4:47
"Introduction" – 1:31
"Hazey Jane I" – 4:31
"Hazey Jane II" – 3:46
"Pink Moon" – 2:04
"Road" – 2:01
"Which Will" – 2:58
"Things Behind the Sun" – 3:56
"Time Has Told Me" – 4:23

Personnel 
Nick Drake performs vocals and acoustic guitar on all songs and piano on "Pink Moon".

Also featured (on various songs):

  Robert Kirby – String arrangements
  Richard Thompson – Guitar
  John Cale – Organ, celeste
  Chris McGregor – Piano
  Paul Harris – Piano
  Danny Thompson – Double bass
  Dave Pegg – Bass
  Ed Carter – Bass
  Mike Kowalski – Drums
  Rocky Dzidzornu – Conga, shaker
  Doris Troy – Backing vocals
  P.P. Arnold – Backing vocals
  Patrick Arnold – Backing vocals
  Ray Warleigh – Saxophone

References

External links
 William Blake: Auguries of Innocence poem online

Nick Drake compilation albums
Albums produced by Joe Boyd
Albums produced by John Wood (record producer)
1985 compilation albums
Island Records compilation albums